Nyanza Province was one of Kenya's eight administrative provinces before the formation of the 47 counties under the 2010 constitution. Six counties were organised in the area of the former province.

The region is located in the southwest part of Kenya around Lake Victoria, includes part of the eastern edge of Lake Victoria, and is inhabited predominantly by the Luo people and Kisii people.  There are also Bantu-speaking tribes, such as the Kuria, and some Luhya, living in the province. The province derives its name from Nyanza, a Bantu word which means a large mass of water.

The provincial capital was Kisumu, the third-largest city in Kenya. The province had a population of 4,392,196 at the 1999 census within an area of 16.162 km², or 12.613 km² of land.

The climate is tropical humid.

Counties 
The following counties make up the area of the former Nyanza province:

Districts after 2007 

Several new districts were created in 2007 in Kenya, also in Nyanza Province:

Languages 
The predominant language in Nyanza is Dholuo, a Nilotic language and Ekegusii (Bantu Languages) whose origins are from South Sudan. It is spoken by the ethnic Luo.

Other languages include Luhya, Kuria, Suba and the national languages of English and Swahili. Other languages from the many Kenyan communities are also spoken in small pockets by migrants from these communities.

Notable residents 

Tom Mboya, politician and former minister
Simeon Nyachae was a Kenyan politician and businessman from Kisii County.
Barack Obama Sr. was born in Nyanza Province. Economist with the government, he was educated in the United States, in Hawaii and Massachusetts. He was the father of the President Barack Obama (2009-2017) of the United States, who was born in Hawaii. 
Jaramogi Oginga Odinga, independence fighter and socialist politician
Raila Odinga, son of Jaramogi Oginga Odinga, is a politician and the leader of Opposition in Kenya.
Bethwell Allan Ogot is a renowned historian and academician.
Achieng Oneko, independence fighter and socialist politician
Robert Ouko, politician and former minister      
James Orengo is a Kenyan lawyer, a well known human rights activist and a prominent politician who is the current senator for Siaya County. 
Prof. Sammy Ongeri, second kisii County senator and former MP Nyaribari Madaba
Elijah Marube, Environmental consultant and an industrialist 
Andrew John Omanga, former minister and Ambassador, Second MP Nyaribari Chache 
James Nyamweya, MP Nyaribari Chache and one of the first Ministers in first Government.
Samson Mwita Marwa, MP

Villages and settlements

Amimos
Bar Olengo
Baragulu
Baroseno
Bonyunyu
Boguche
Bonyakoni
Buholo
Bukangasi
Bulungo
Bulwani
Bumburia
Busonga
Bumudondo
Homa Lime Kowuor
Jaleny
Kabola
Kadenge
Karadolo
Kobodo
Kodiaga
Kogoe
Lwala
Lady Whitehouse
Magunga
Marinde
Marucha
Mehuru
Migoko
Mirieri
Mirogi
Mohanda Arunde
Musa Nyandisi
Mutet
Muweri
Mw'aboto
Ngia
Ngiri, Kenya
Nyabera
Nyadorera
Nyamuga
Nyamware
Nyangweso
Nyowita
Uranga

References

External links 
 Languages
 https://web.archive.org/web/20060820152345/http://www.yale.edu/swahili/  Swahili- English translation
 Kisii Language - Kisii English- Ekegusii translation

 
Provinces of Kenya
Former provinces
2013 disestablishments in Kenya